Ruslan Kamilyevich Mingazov (born 23 November 1991) is a Turkmen professional footballer who currently plays for Hong Kong Premier League club Kitchee, as a right or left midfielder.

Club career

Early career
Ruslan Mingazow started playing football at the age of 6, being taken to the first training by his father, Kamil, who is also a former Turkmeni footballer. At the beginning he had to train with an older group of players because there was none for his age. Mingazow played for FC Aşgabat youth team and was taken to the first team in 2007, aged 16. The same year he helped his club win the Turkmenistan Super Cup. A year later Mingazow became the champion of Turkmenistan, winning the 2008 Ýokary Liga. In 2009 Mingazow participated in the Turkmenistan President's Cup and helped his club reach the semi-finals, scoring two goals in three matches.

Skonto Rīga
Following the impressive performance at the Turkmenistan President's Cup, Mingazow was invited to join the tournament's finalists, Latvian Higher League club Skonto Rīga, on trial by their manager Paul Ashworth. Having received another offer from Armenian Premier League, Mingazow, eventually, signed a contract with the Latvian side in June 2009. He scored his first Latvian Higher League goal in a 5–0 victory over Daugava Rīga on 8 July 2009. During his first season at the club Mingazow participated in 20 league matches, scoring twice. In 2010 Mingazow helped Skonto become the champions of Latvia for the first time since 2004 under their new manager Aleksandrs Starkovs. In 2011 Skonto won the Baltic League, beating another Latvian side FK Ventspils in the final's penalty shoot-out. In 2012 Mingazow won the Latvian Cup, as Skonto beat Liepājas Metalurgs in the final via penalty shoot-out. On 4 July 2013 Mingazow scored the only goal in 1–0 away victory over FC Tiraspol, helping Skonto reach the second round of the 2013–14 UEFA Europa League. In the second round Mingazow provided an excellent assist for his team-mate Artūrs Karašausks as Skonto beat the Synot liga side Slovan Liberec 2–1 at home. Mingazow was named the best player of the Latvian Higher League in August 2013.

Baumit Jablonec
On 27 August 2014 Mingazow joined the Czech First League club Baumit Jablonec.

Slavia Prague
Mingazow joined another Czech First League team, Slavia Prague, in June 2016. On 2 April 2017, he gained notoriety in Czech press after winning a controversial penalty kick in the Sparta - Slavia derby, allowing Slavia to equalize from the spot in injury time. The disciplinary board of referees later ruled that it had been a dive by Mingazow, but no punishment was issued. He scored his first league goal for Slavia on 17 April 2017 in a 4–0 home win against Hradec Králové. On 15 June 2018, Slavia announced that Mingazow will be looking for new opportunities and will no longer play for Slavia. On 7 September 2018, Slavia announced that Mingazow had joined 1. FK Příbram on loan for the first half of the season.

Irtysh Pavlodar
July 23, 2019 Ruslan Mingazov, as a free agent, signed a contract with Kazakhstani FC Irtysh Pavlodar. In December 2019, he extended the contract until the end of 2020. In the spring of 2020, due to financial problems, FC Irtysh Pavlodar withdrew from the championship of Kazakhstan. The footballer spent 13 matches for FC Irtysh Pavlodar, scored 2 goals and gave 3 assists in the Kazakhstan Premier League.

Shakhter Karagandy
On 6 August 2020, Mingazow signed for Kazakh club FC Shakhter Karagandy, making his debut on 19 August, in a 1-0 defeat to FC Kaisar.

Caspiy
On 26 February 2021, FC Caspiy announced the signing of Mingazow.

Kitchee
On 3 March 2022, Kitchee announced the signing of Mingazow.

International career

Mingazow made his senior national team debut on 14 April 2009, in an 2010 AFC Challenge Cup Qualification match against Maldives. He scored his first national team goal against Bhutan in the very next match on 16 April 2009, also in AFC Challenge Cup qualifying.

Career statistics

Club

International

Scores and results list Turkmenistan's goal tally first, score column indicates score after each Mingazow goal.

Honours
Aşgabat
 Ýokary Liga: 2008
 Turkmenistan Super Cup: 2007

Skonto
 Latvian Higher League: 2010
 Latvian Football Cup: 2011–12
 Baltic League: 2010–11

Slavia Prague
 Czech First League: 2016–17

Personal life
Mingazow is an ethnic  Tatar. Ruslan Mingazow's father Kamil is also a former Turkmenistani footballer, who played for the national team. He has got two sisters, one of whom is 3 years older and the other one 14 years younger. During his stay in Riga Mingazow was studying business management at the Baltic International Academy.

References

External links
 
 Jablonets profile

1991 births
Living people
Sportspeople from Ashgabat
Turkmenistan footballers
Association football midfielders
Turkmenistan international footballers
Turkmenistan expatriate footballers
FC Aşgabat players
Skonto FC players
FK Jablonec players
SK Slavia Prague players
FK Mladá Boleslav players
1. FK Příbram players
FC Irtysh Pavlodar players
FC Shakhter Karagandy players
Kitchee SC players
Latvian Higher League players
Czech First League players
Kazakhstan Premier League players
Hong Kong Premier League players
Expatriate footballers in Latvia
Expatriate footballers in the Czech Republic
Expatriate footballers in Kazakhstan
Expatriate footballers in Hong Kong
Turkmenistan expatriate sportspeople in Latvia
Turkmenistan expatriate sportspeople in the Czech Republic
Turkmenistan expatriate sportspeople in Kazakhstan
Turkmenistan people of Tatar descent
Tatar sportspeople
Footballers at the 2010 Asian Games
2019 AFC Asian Cup players
Asian Games competitors for Turkmenistan